A Singular Woman: The Untold Story of Barack Obama's Mother is a 2011 book by former The New York Times journalist Janny Scott. It is a biography of Ann Dunham, the mother of U.S. President Barack Obama.

References

External links
After Words interview with Scott on A Singular Woman, May 28, 2011

Books about Barack Obama
American political books
2011 non-fiction books